Oleksandr Volodymyrovych Krykun (born 1 March 1968 in Leipzig, Sachsen) is a former Ukrainian hammer thrower. At the 1996 Olympics in Atlanta, Krykun won a bronze medal in hammer throw, averaging heaves of 80.02 meters.

Achievements

References

sports-reference

1968 births
Living people
Ukrainian male hammer throwers
Athletes (track and field) at the 1996 Summer Olympics
Athletes (track and field) at the 2000 Summer Olympics
Athletes (track and field) at the 2004 Summer Olympics
Olympic bronze medalists for Ukraine
Olympic athletes of Ukraine
Athletes from Leipzig
Medalists at the 1996 Summer Olympics
Olympic bronze medalists in athletics (track and field)
Universiade medalists in athletics (track and field)
Universiade silver medalists for Ukraine
Medalists at the 1995 Summer Universiade
20th-century Ukrainian people
21st-century Ukrainian people